"Closer" is a song by English singer-songwriter Corinne Bailey Rae, released as the third and final single from her second studio album The Sea (2010). It was the third UK and worldwide single and had a release date of 2 August 2010. It was also issued to radio alone in the United States on 25 January 2010.

Promotion
Bailey Rae's first television performance of the song was on The Ellen DeGeneres Show on 28 January.

Critical reception
Early comments regarding "Closer", in album reviews for The Sea were mixed.

Nick Day  Slant Magazine gave a mixed review of the song, stating:

"The moment the rhythm breaks, as with "Closer," it's a struggle to reengage with music that is so intensely personal, so overwhelmingly desolate and yet somehow unmemorable.

Also in a mixed review, Tony Hardy of Consequenceofsound wrote "'Closer' finds the artiste in more of a classic R&B mode... the sentiments are bleak. It's accomplished stuff but not necessarily as strong as the earlier songs."

However, Mayer Nassim from Digital Spy was more positive expressing:

"The best moments here are when Rae lets her hair down. The deep soul of 'Closer' is a good example."

Formats and track listings

UK Promo CD

 "Closer" (Radio Edit) - 3:36
 "Closer" (Instrumental) - 4:17

Music video
The music video for "Closer" was directed by Adria Petty and premiered on 1 July 2010. It features the singer as she performs the song in a dark room, bringing "a dreamy sensuous feel, perfect for a steamy summer playlist."

"I had such an amazing time making this video. The director, Adria Petty, has brilliant ideas," Bailey Rae said. "We both thought about the feel of the song and independently imagined a slightly seventies look, Donna Summer sexy, abandoned roller disco fun".
Of her favorite scene in the clip, she chooses the one which features her "with the veil inspired by a 1970s Vogue cover by Bianca Jagger." She added, "The choreographer Frank Gatson was on hand to offer me advice about movement in the video. He helped my focus of the strength shape I was making".

Chart performance
The single spent 31 weeks inside the Hot R&B/Hip-Hop Songs and reached a peak of thirty-one, being her highest chart single ever on that chart. On the week of 28 August 2010, the song returned to the Top 50 R&B/Hip-Hop Songs at number #50, and on the week of 4 September 2010, the song climbed higher to number #36.

Charts

Weekly charts

Year-end charts

Airplay and release history

Airplay

Purchasable release

References

2010 singles
Corinne Bailey Rae songs
Songs written by Corinne Bailey Rae
2010 songs
EMI Records singles